Banke Bihari Temple is a Vaishnava Hindu temple situated in the town of Vrindavan, Mathura district of Uttar Pradesh, India. The temple is dedicated to Banke Bihari who is believed to be the combined form of Radha and Krishna. Banke Bihari was originally worshipped at Nidhivan, Vrindavan. Later, when Banke Bihari temple was constructed around 1864, the icon of Banke Bihari was moved to new temple.

The icon of Radha Krishna's united form stands in the Tribhanga posture. Swami Haridas originally worshipped this devotional image under the name of Kunj-Bihari ("one who enjoys in the groves (Kunj) of Vrindavan").

'Bānke' means 'bent', and 'Bihāri' or 'Vihāri' means 'enjoyer'. This is how Kṛiṣhṇa, who is bent in three places, got the name "Bānke Bihāri". According to Śrī Brahma-saḿhitā (verse 5.31), Brahma says the following about Kṛishna

"I worship Govinda, the primeval Lord, round whose neck is swinging a garland of flowers beautified with the moon-locket, whose two hands are adorned with the flute and jewelled ornaments, who always revels in pastimes of love, whose graceful threefold-bending form of Śyāmasundara is eternally manifest."

History
Banke Bihari Temple was established by Swami Haridas (Lalita Sakhi in Dvapara Yuga), a guru of the famous singer Tansen. Once at the request of his disciples Swami Haridasji sang the following verse in Nidhivan, Vrindavan "Mai ri Sahaj Jori pragat Bhai Ju rang ki gaur Syam ghan damini jaisen.
Pratham hun ahuti ab hun aagen hun rahihai na tarihai taisain..
Ang ang ki ujraii sugharaii chaturaii sunderta aisain...
Shri Haridas ke swami syama kunjbihari sam vais vaisain.." 
On singing the verse, the Celestial couple Shyama-Shyam (Radha Krishna) appeared in front of him and his devotees. At the request of Shri Swamiji, the couple merged into one and the stone image of Banke Bihari appeared there (the same image is seen in the temple).
The image was established in Nidhivan.

The stone image of Bihariji installed in Shri Banke Bihari Mandir is the one granted to Swami Haridas by the celestial couple Shyama-Shyam themselves. Submitting to the desire of devotees, The Lord appeared in person with his divine consort and left-back a black charming image before disappearing.

Swami Haridas was born to Shri Ashudhir and his wife Srimati Gangadevi on the day of Radha Ashtami i.e. eighth day of the second (bright) fortnight of Bhadrapad month of the year 1535 Vikrami (1478 A.D.). He was born in a small village, now known as Haridaspur, near Aligarh in Uttar Pradesh. The lineage of the family can be traced back to Shri Gargacharya. Shri Gargachrya was the Kulaguru (family guru) of Yadavas and visited Brij secretly for conducting the Namakarana Samskara (naming ceremony) of young Krishna and Balarama on request of Sri Vasudeva. A branch of the family migrated to Multan (now in Pakistan), but some of them returned after a long time. Sri Ashudhir was one such migrant who after returning from Multan settled at the outskirts of Brij, near Aligarh.

Swami Haridas was the reincarnation of Lalita ‘sakhi’ (female friend), of the inner consortium of Lord Krishna. This easily explains the fact that even in his childhood, he was more into meditation and scriptures, while other children of his age were busy playing. He was married at a suitable age according to the time to Harimati. Even after his marriage, young Haridas stayed away from worldly pleasures and concentrated on meditation. Harimatiji was such a saintly soul herself that on realizing the inclination of her husband, she prayed intensely and was bodily transported to the heavenly abode of Lord by entering the flame of a small lamp in the presence of Haridas. No physical remains were left behind.

Soon after that Haridas left his village for Vrindavan, which was a dense forest at that time and chose a secluded spot, which is now known as Nidhivan, to practice his music and to enjoy the eternal bliss of meditation. He constantly and continuously meditated on Nitya Ras and Nitya Bihar of Lord at Nitya Vrindavan. His way of Sadhna was to compose and sing songs in the praise of the Lord. While on earth, living in a mortal state, he facilitated his regular unobstructed entry in the Nitya Bihar and always enjoyed the pleasure of closeness of Lord. He chose a secluded and densely forested area, Kunj, in Nidhivan as his gateway to the nirvana and was mostly sitting there, singing, meditating and surfing in the ocean of eternal bliss.

His disciples were curious about this place and one day with the permission of Swamiji, they all entered the Kunj. But instead of seeing anything, they were almost blinded by bright, intense light, which seemed to fill the whole place. On knowing of their plight Swamiji himself went there, and then after his requests, the lord appeared in person with his divine consort, pleasantly smiling and in a playful mood and casting a spell of charm on every living being present there. Those who witnessed this were so spell bounded by the beauty of the Lord and his consort, that they couldn't even blink their eyes; it seemed that all of them had turned into stone statues.

The legend as handed down to the generations of Goswamis, says that the beauty of the divine couple was such that no one wanted to lose the sight and proximity of divinity, but then what kind of divinity is it, which cannot make a mere mortal swoon and charmed enough to forget and give up the world and its luxuries? The beauty of the divine couple was so much that lesser mortals, like you and me, won't be able to bear such a heavenly beauty. Sensing this Swami Haridasji requested both of them to take a single form, as the world won't be able to bear their image. He requested them to take a single form like Ghan (cloud) and Damini (lightning), thus giving a perfect metaphor to the combined beauty of the dark Lord and his fair consort, Radhaji.

Also, he wanted his beloved lord to be in front of his eyes always. Granting him his both wishes, the couple turned itself into one single black charming image, the same one that you see in the temple today. The charm and beauty of Shri Banke Bihariji is the only reason why the ‘darshan’ in the temple is never continuous but is broken by the curtain drawn on him regularly. It is also said that if one stares long enough into the eyes of Shri Banke Bihariji, the person would lose his self-consciousness.

Thus came into existence the physical form of Lord Banke Bihari, popularly known as Bihariji. The responsibility of Sewa of Bihariji was handed over to Goswami Jagannath by Swamiji himself. Goswami Jagannath was one of the principal disciples and younger brothers of Swamiji. By tradition, the Sewa is performed by descendants of Jagannath Goswami till day.

Initially, the deity was installed in a temple close to the first appearance in Nidhivan. A new temple befitting the glory of Bihariji was constructed in 1862 AD. Goswamis themselves mobilized resources for the construction. The temple is an architectural beauty in itself and follows the contemporary Rajasthani style.

The sewa of the Bihariji is unique in its own way. It is performed in three parts every day i.e. Shringar, Rajbhog and Shayan. While shringar (which includes bath, dressing and adornment with jewellery like crown and necklaces) and Rajbhog(feast) are offered in the forenoon, Shayan Sewa (Shayan means sleep) is offered in the evening. The temple doesn't have a tradition of Mangala (early morning) sewa. Swami Haridas did not favour Mangla Sewa as he wanted his childlike Lord to take complete rest and did not want to disturb him out of deep slumber so early in the morning.

So, the temple today stands with its full glory, inside which the Lord himself resides. It is thronged by thousands of visitors every day.

Rituals

During Jhulan Yatra, the swing festival of Lord Krishna, there are a number of silver-plated and some solid silver ornamented swings, which are shown at this time. The main day of Jhulan Yatra is the third day of the waxing moon, at which time Shri Banke Bihari is placed on a golden swing (hindola).
The curtain before the Deities is not left open like at other temples. Every few minutes, the curtain is pulled shut and then opened again. It is said that the brilliant eyes of Shri Banke Bihari will make one unconscious if seen for too long a stretch. It is the only temple where loud temple bells are not used to wake Krishna in the morning. It is believed improper to wake a child with a start. He is woken gently. There are thus no bells even for Aarti, as it might disturb Him.

The Deities do not get up until 9 am, because it is believed that Banke Bihariji has been up until late at night sporting. Mangala-arati is only one day a year in this temple, on Janmasthami. Only one day a year can the lotus feet of the Deity be seen, on Akshaya Tritiya (Chandan Darshan or Dolotsav), on the third day of the bright half of the month of Vaishaka (April–May). The autumn full moon day is the only day that the Deity holds a flute, and also on this day, He wears a special mukut (crown). Shri Banke Bihari comes off his altar and can be seen in full view on the last five days of the month of Phalguna, during the Holi festival. He can be seen with four gopis, who are seen just at this time.

Gallery

See also
Radha Krishna
Radha-vallabha 
Nidhivan, Vrindavan 
Prem Mandir Vrindavan
Krishna Balaram Mandir
Radha Raman Temple
Radha Rani Temple, Barsana
Radha Damodar Temple, Vrindavan
Radha Madan Mohan Temple, Vrindavan
Six Goswamis of Vrindavan

References

External links
 Official website
 Shri Bankey Bihari Temple -thedivineindia.com
 
 Banke Bihari Meaning-theagranews.com

Krishna temples
Radha Krishna temples
Hindu temples in Mathura district
Vrindavan